Lajos Zentai, shortly Zentai (born August 2, 1966) is a Hungarian footballer who played as a defender.

Club career
He played for FC Seoul of the South Korean K League, then known as LG Cheetahs.

References

External links
 
 Lajos Zentai – Hungary League stats
 Lajos Zentai profile at Magyarfutball.hu
 Photograph at LG Cheetahs

1967 births
Living people
Association football defenders
Vasas SC players
K League 1 players
FC Seoul players
Hungarian footballers
Hungarian expatriate footballers
Hungarian expatriate sportspeople in South Korea
Expatriate footballers in South Korea